Deberny & Peignot (Fonderie Deberny et Peignot) was a French type foundry, created by the 1923 merger of G. Peignot & Fils and Deberny & Cie. It was bought by the Haas Type Foundry (Switzerland) in 1972, which in turn was merged into D. Stempel AG in 1985, then into Linotype GmbH in 1989, and is now part of Monotype Corporation.

Starting in 1925, Deberny & Peignot type was distributed in the United States by Continental Type Founders Association.

Typefaces
These typefaces were produced by Deberny & Peignot:

 Acier Noir (1936, A.M. Cassandre)
 Ancien
 Astrée (1921, Robert Girard), the Stephenson Blake version is known as Mazarin
 Auriol, (1901–04, George Auriol)
 Auriol-Labeur  (George Auriol)
 Auriol-Champlevé (George Auriol)
 Banjo (1930)
 Baskerville (1916), reengraved from the original punches.
 Bellery-Desfontaines (1910–1912, Henri Bellery-Desfontaines)
 Bifur (1929, A.M. Cassandre)
 Calligraphiques
 Cochin (Georges Peignot)
 Compactes Italiques
 Cristal (1955, Rémy Peignot)
 Cyclopéen (1910, anon.)
 Éclair (1935)
 Égyptienne (Adrian Frutiger)
 Film (1934, Marcel Jacno)
 Firmin Didot Cut from the original punches of Firmin Didot.
 Floride (1939, Imre Reiner)
 Fournier-le Jeune (1913) Based on the decorated letters of Pierre Simon Fournier.
 Française-allongée (George Auriol)
 Française-légère (George Auriol)
 Garamond, roman and italic (1926, Henri Parmentier) first called "Garamont," based on originals by Jean Jannon (1580–1635) held at the Imprimerie nationale, directed by Georges Peignot, from 1912 to 1914.
 Grasset (1898, Eugène Grasset)
 Guy-Arnoux capitales (1914, Guy Arnoux)
 Jacno (1950, Marcel Jacno)
 La Civilité
 Méridien (1957, Adrian Frutiger)
 Moreau-le-Jeune (P. Roy et A. Marty), later copied by Ludwig & Mayer as Sonderdruck.
 Naudin (1911–24, Bernard Naudin), a set of open face capitals that complement this face were sold in France as Champlevé and in the United States as Sylvan.
 Nicolas-Cochin, roman and italic (Georges Peignot)
 Olympic (1937), also called Slimblack
 Ondine (Adrian Frutiger)
 Pharaon (1933)
 Phoebus (1953, Adrian Frutiger)
 Peignot (1937, A. M. Cassandre)
 Polyphème (1910, anon.)
 President (1954, Adrian Frutiger)
 Robur Pale (c. 1912, George Auriol), variations are known as Royal Lining and Clair de lune.
 Scribe (1937, Marcel Jacno)
 Série 16 + Série 18
 Sphinx (1925, M. Deberny)
 Style moderne (ca. 1903), today, sold as Fantastic
 Touraine (1947, A.M. Cassandre)
 Univers (1957, Adrian Frutiger)

Univers
Deberny & Peignot's release of "Univers" in 1957 was the first typeface to be manufactured simultaneously as hand-set type, Monotype mechanical type, and photo type, bridging all the technological advances that had developed over the history of typesetting to that time. The company produced twenty-one width and weight variations of "Univers" complete with an innovative numbering system that identified each characteristic, and dispensing with historical names, such as "bold" and "extra bold."

Notes

External links
 Rochester Institute of Technology: History of Deberny et Peignot, a comprehensive company history (Internet Archive, dd. September 28, 2010)
 Typographie & Civilisation: Georges Peignot: la tentation de l'Art Nouveau, an historical account by Georges Peignot's grandson Jean-Luc Froissart (in French)

References
 Jean-Luc Froissart, 2004. L’or, l’âme et les cendres du plomb. L'épopée des Peignot, 1815–1983. Paris: librairie Tekhnê, 400 pages. 

Letterpress font foundries of France
Metal companies of France